Podsosenye is a rural locality (a village) in Samotovinskoye Rural Settlement, Velikoustyugsky District, Vologda Oblast, Russia. The population was 249 as of 2002.

Geography 
Podsosenye is located 10 km southwest of Veliky Ustyug (the district's administrative centre) by road. Chernyatino is the nearest rural locality.

References 

Rural localities in Velikoustyugsky District